McKinley Vocational High School is a public high school in Buffalo, New York. The school is located at 1500 Elmwood Avenue, and serves about 1200 students from Grades 9 - 12.

History 

McKinley was formed in 1910 as Black Rock Vocational School. It moved into its current address on Elmwood in 1923, which formerly had housed the Buffalo Orphan's Asylum. The current building was built in 1966. The school is named for former United States President William McKinley, who was assassinated just a few blocks away from where the school in 1901.

In 2010, the building began undergoing extensive renovations to add more classroom space and expand its vocational programs. The ninth graders were housed at the former School 56 until renovations were completed on the McKinley building. McKinley was re-opened to all students in Fall 2012.

On February 9, 2022, a fight after school turned violent, resulting in 14-year-old Sirgio Jeter being stabbed 10 times in his colon, diaphragm and kidneys, and Brad Walker, a 27-year-old security guard attempting to break up the fight was shot in the leg. Both survived. A 17-year-old who went to the school was picked up as a suspect and charged. Another 17-year-old juvenile was also taken into custody.

Former principals 
Previous assignment and reason for departure denoted in parentheses
Samuel F. King–1923-1934 (Principal - Black Rock Vocational School, retired)
Robert S. Hoole–1934-1953 (Vice Principal - Seneca Vocational High School, retired)
Ferdinand E. Kampreth–1953-1965 (Vice Principal - McKinley Vocational High School, retired)
Albert B. Buck–1965-1972 (Vice Principal - Emerson Vocational High School, retired)
James F. Harmon–1972-1984 (Principal - Woodlawn Junior High School, named Principal of Burgard Vocational High School)
Ronald J. Meer–1984-1987 (Central Office Administrator - Buffalo Public Schools, named Principal of Leonardo da Vinci High School)
Crystal A. Boling-Barton–1987-2017 (Assistant Principal - South Park High School, placed on leave)
Marck E. Abraham [interim]–2017-2020 (Assistant Principal - McKinley Vocational High School, resigned)
Naomi R. Cerre [interim]–2020-2021 (Assistant Principal - Academy School 131 @ 4, retired)

Academics 

McKinley offers Regents level courses as required by New York State. McKinley's curriculum includes a career and technical component in classes such as Advertising Art, Aquatic Ecology, Horticulture, Machine Tool Technology, Printing, and four Building Trades: Electrical Technology, Carpentry, Plumbing, and Sheet Metal Technology.

Notable alumni
Goo Goo Dolls lead singer and guitarist John Rzeznik attended McKinley, graduating in 1983.
College and professional basketball coach Bob MacKinnon attended McKinley, graduating in 1946.

References

High schools in Buffalo, New York
Public high schools in New York (state)